Stenidea gemina is a species of beetle in the family Cerambycidae. It was described by Pascoe in 1888. It is known from South Africa.

References

gemina
Beetles described in 1888